Auximobasis is a genus of the gelechioid moth family Blastobasidae. It is sometimes included in Blastobasis.

Species
 Auximobasis normalis Meyrick, 1918
 Auximobasis administra Meyrick, 1922
 Auximobasis agrestis Meyrick, 1922
 Auximobasis angusta Meyrick, 1922
 Auximobasis brevipalpella Walsingham, 1897
 Auximobasis bromeliae Walsingham, 1912
 Auximobasis coffeaella Busck, 1925
 Auximobasis confectella Zeller, 1873
 Auximobasis constans Walsingham, 1897
 Auximobasis flaviciliata Walsingham, 1897
 Auximobasis flavida Meyrick, 1922
 Auximobasis floridella Dietz, 1910
 Auximobasis fractilinea Zeller, 1873
 Auximobasis glandulella Riley, 1871
 Auximobasis incretata Meyrick, 1931
 Auximobasis insularis Walsingham, 1897
 Auximobasis invigorata Meyrick, 1932
 Auximobasis liberatella Walker, 1864
 Auximobasis neptes Walsingham, 1912
 Auximobasis nothrotes Walsingham, 1907
 Auximobasis obstricta Meyrick, 1918
 Auximobasis persimilella Walsingham, 1891
 Auximobasis prolixa Meyrick, 1922
 Auximobasis quaintancella Dietz, 1910
 Auximobasis repartella Dietz, 1910
 Auximobasis retectella Zeller, 1873
 Auximobasis tarachodes Walsingham, 1912
 Auximobasis variolata Walsingham, 1897

References

Blastobasidae genera
Blastobasidae